Li Siguang (26 October 1889 – 29 April 1971), also known as J. S. Lee, was a Chinese geologist and politician. He was the founder of China's geomechanics. He was an ethnic Mongol. He made outstanding contributions, which changed the situation of "oil deficiency" in the country, enabling the large-scale development of oil fields to raise the country to the ranks of the world's major oil producers.

Biography
Li was born as Li Zhongkui in Huanggang, Hubei Province. His paternal grandfather was a Mongolian beggar who migrated to Hubei in search of a better livelihood, and his family originally had the Mongol surname "Kuli" or "Ku". He was often known in English as J. S. Lee (J for Zhongkui/Jung-kuei, S for Siguang).

Li studied in Osaka Technical College in Japan and the University of Birmingham in UK in his early years. He became a geological professor at Peking University upon his return from abroad in 1920. Li Siguang was Wuhan University building preparatory chairman from July 1928 to April 1938. He was the president of National Central University (Nanjing University) in 1932.

After the People's Republic of China was established, Li held the positions of vice president of the Chinese Academy of Sciences (CAS) and minister of geology.

After the end of the Cultural Revolution (1966–1976), Xu Chi published Li's biography entitled The Light of Geology, which was widely read and made Li a household name in China.

Family 

Li Siguang's daughter Li Lin was a physicist and academician of the CAS. She married Chen-Lu Tsou (Zou Chenglu), a distinguished biochemist and academician, while they were both attending the University of Cambridge in England. Li's family is thus the only one in China that has produced three academicians. Li Lin's daughter, Zou Zongping followed her grandfather's footsteps and became a geologist.

References

1889 births
1971 deaths
Osaka University alumni
Alumni of the University of Birmingham
Chinese expatriates in the United Kingdom
20th-century Chinese geologists
Chinese people of Mongolian descent
Academic staff of China University of Geosciences
Foreign Members of the USSR Academy of Sciences
Members of the Chinese Academy of Sciences
Members of Academia Sinica
Academic staff of the National Central University
Educators from Hubei
Academic staff of Peking University
People's Republic of China politicians from Hubei
National Wuhan University alumni
Presidents of Wuhan University
Politicians from Huanggang
Scientists from Hubei
Vice Chairpersons of the National Committee of the Chinese People's Political Consultative Conference
Burials at Babaoshan Revolutionary Cemetery